Anton Brehmer (born February 6, 1994) is a Swedish ice hockey player. He is currently playing with Örebro HK of the Swedish Hockey League (SHL).

Brehmer made his Elitserien debut playing with Linköpings HC during the 2012–13 Elitserien season.

References

External links

1994 births
Living people
Linköping HC players
Örebro HK players
Swedish ice hockey centres
Sportspeople from Örebro